Wara may refer to:

Places 
 Wara, Poland, a village in the Subcarpathian Voivodeship, south-eastern Poland
 Wara, Gifu, a village in Gifu Prefecture, Japan
 Ouara, the former capital of the Ouaddai Empire of Chad

Languages
 Samwe language, or Wara, one language of Burkina Faso
 Paleni language, or Wara, another language of Burkina Faso
 Upper Morehead language (Wára), a language of Papua New Guinea

Other uses 
 Wara', piety (in Arabic), a concept central to Abrahamic religions
 Wära, a defunct experimental currency of 1920s Germany
 Wur, also known as Wara or Wara Mamund, a Pashtun tribe of Afghanistan and Pakistan
 Wara art, a Japanese craft of making sculptures of rice straw, wara meaning rice straw in Japanese

See also 
 
 WARA (disambiguation)
 Ouara (disambiguation)
 Warah, a tehsil in the Qambar Shahdadkot District of Sindh, Pakistan